Jean Dedieu (c.1645 – 31 May 1727) was a French sculptor. His brother Pons Dedieu (also a sculptor) was grandfather of Antoine Raspal and great-grandfather of Jacques Réattu, both painters.

References

 Jules Belleudy, Jean Dedieu sculpteur du Roi, Mémoires de l'Académie de Vaucluse 1925 pp 185–203
 Alain Charron, « Les artistes arlésiens des xviie et xviiie siècles » dans Jean-Maurice Rouquette (dir.), Paul Allard, Régis Bertrand et Marc Heijmans, Arles, histoire, territoires et cultures, Arles, Actes Sud, 2008, 1304 p. (OCLC 259989766), p. 703-705

French Baroque sculptors
1727 deaths
1645 births
People from Arles